Gagny is an RER station in Gagny and near of Villemomble in north suburb of Paris, in Seine-Saint-Denis department, France It is situated on the RER E suburban railway line.

External links

 

Réseau Express Régional stations
Railway stations in Seine-Saint-Denis
Railway stations in France opened in 1849